Route 224 is a collector road in the Canadian province of Nova Scotia. It is located in the Halifax Regional Municipality and Colchester County, connecting Sheet Harbour at Trunk 7 with Milford Station at Exit 9 of Highway 102 and Trunk 14. The route passes through the upper half of the Musquodoboit Valley.

Route description
The route begins at Exit 9 of Highway 102 in Milford Station in East Hants and runs north to Shubenacadie, where Route 224 is duplexed with Trunk 2 for a short time. Then, the route crosses the Shubenacadie River and enters Colchester County, then turns right and runs south through Pine Grove, to Gays River, where it meets Route 277. The route then turns southeast, then enters the Halifax Regional Municipality.

Route 224 then passes through Cooks Brook and Chaswood, to Middle Musquodoboit, where it meets Route 357. The route then turns left and runs through the northeastern part of the Musquodoboit Valley, passing through Centre Musquodoboit and Elmsvale. The route passes by the Musquodoboit Valley Provincial park in Middle Musquodoboit. In Upper Musquodoboit, the route meets Route 336 and turns south, where it begins to ascend the southern slope of the Musquodoboit Valley.

Route 224 was originally named Trunk 24.

Communities
Milford Station
Shubenacadie
Pine Grove
Gays River
Cooks Brook
Chaswood
Middle Musquodoboit
Centre Musquodoboit 
Elmsvale
Greenwood
Upper Musquodoboit
Sheet Harbour Road
Beaver Dam
Marinette
Sheet Harbour

See also

List of Nova Scotia provincial highways

References

Nova Scotia provincial highways
Roads in Halifax, Nova Scotia
Roads in Colchester County